Polia may refer to:

People
  (born 1947), Italian historian, anthropologist, ethnographer and archaeologist
 Polia Pillin (1909–1992), Polish-American ceramist

Places
 Polia, Calabria, Italy

Species
 Polia (moth), genus of moths of the family Noctuidae
 Polia's shrew, species of mammal in the family Soricidae